This is the discography of Serbian and Yugoslav rock band YU Grupa. This discography consists of 10 studio albums, 1 live album, 10 7-inch singles, and 2 compilation albums. This list does not include solo material or side projects performed by the members.

Studio albums

Live albums

Compilation albums

Singles

Various artists live albums

External links
The official YU Grupa discography

Discographies of Serbian artists
Rock music group discographies